Nikos Lougos (born 27 July 1992) is a Greek professional footballer who plays as a left-back for Cypriot club Aris Limassol.

References

1992 births
Living people
Greek footballers
Greek expatriate footballers
Football League (Greece) players
Gamma Ethniki players
Cypriot First Division players
Cypriot Second Division players
Paniliakos F.C. players
Niki Volos F.C. players
PAEEK players
Digenis Oroklinis players
Nea Salamis Famagusta FC players
Karmiotissa FC players
Aris Limassol FC players
Association football defenders
Footballers from Larissa